M'Bengué is a town in northern Ivory Coast. It is a sub-prefecture of and the seat of M'Bengué Department in Poro Region, Savanes District. M'Bengué is also a commune.

In 2021, the population of the sub-prefecture of M'Bengué was 65,779.

Nambira village within the sub-prefecture is known for its adobe mosque, built in the 18th and 19th centuries. This mosque, along with other mosques in northern Ivory Coast, was inscribed on the UNESCO World Heritage List in 2021 as a well-preserved example of Sudano-Sahelian architecture.

Villages
The 32 villages of the sub-prefecture of M'Bengué and their population in 2014 are:

Notes

Sub-prefectures of Poro Region
Communes of Poro Region